Apallaga pooanus, commonly known as the Bitje sprite, is a species of butterfly in the family Hesperiidae. It is found in Nigeria (the Cross River loop), Cameroon, Bioko, Gabon and possibly the Democratic Republic of the Congo (from the north-east to the Ituri Forest). The habitat consists of forests.

Adults have been recorded feeding on flowers of Mussaenda species.

References

Butterflies described in 1910
Hesperiidae